Alojzy Wiktor Lysko (born 15 February 1942) is a Silesian writer and politician. He was elected to the Sejm on 25 September 2005, getting 6581 votes in 31 Katowice district as a candidate from the Law and Justice list.

During the World War II Alojzy Lysko's father was forced into the Wehrmacht. Lysko, a famous Silesian activist, collects narratives from these forgotten soldiers with the hope of getting closer to his father. 
He wrote the book To byli nasi ojcowie: legendy rodzinne z Górnego Śląska o poległych żołnierzach Wehrmachtu, Bojszowy 1999.

See also
Members of Polish Sejm 2005-2007

External links
Alojzy Lysko - parliamentary page – includes declarations of interest, voting record, and transcripts of speeches.

1942 births
Living people
People from Bieruń-Lędziny County
Members of the Polish Sejm 2005–2007
Law and Justice politicians